Guillaume de Farges was a 14th-century French priest: a nephew of Pope Clement V, he was Archdeacon of Leicester from 1310 until his death in 1346.

Notes

See also
 Diocese of Lincoln
 Diocese of Peterborough
 Diocese of Leicester
 Archdeacon of Leicester

Archdeacons of Leicester
13th-century French people
Lincoln Cathedral
1346 deaths